The California Baptist Lancers are the athletic teams that represent California Baptist University, located in Riverside, California, in intercollegiate sports as a member of the Division I level of the National Collegiate Athletic Association (NCAA), primarily competing in the Western Athletic Conference (WAC) for most of its sports since the 2018–19 academic year; while the men's water polo team competes in the Western Water Polo Association (WWPA); the women's water polo team competes in the Golden Coast Conference (GCC); and the men's wrestling team competes in the Big 12 Conference. The men's water polo team will move to the West Coast Conference in 2023. The Lancers previously competed in the Pacific West Conference (PacWest) of the NCAA Division II ranks from 2011–12 to 2017–18; and in the Golden State Athletic Conference (GSAC) of the National Association of Intercollegiate Athletics (NAIA) from 1987–88 to 2010–11.

The Lancers also field a team in STUNT, a sport not currently recognized by the NCAA. A member vote will be held at the January 2023 NCAA convention to add STUNT as an emerging sport for women. The Lancers STUNT team competes as an independent in the College STUNT Association. In a rematch of the 2021 title game, the Lancers defeated Oklahoma Baptist, 20–5, on April 24, 2022, to win their second consecutive College STUNT Association national championship. The Lancers had beaten Oklahoma Baptist, 19–11, on May 1, 2021, to win the previous season's title.

Move to the NCAA
During the transition process, Cal Baptist's athletic teams were ineligible for NCAA postseason competition. Cal Baptist received full membership into the NCAA . Cal Baptist had been a member of the NAIA since 1969 and has won 26 GSAC Championships, 19 NAIA National Championships, and an NACDA Directors' Cup

Sports sponsored 
Cal Baptist competes in 19 intercollegiate varsity sports: Men's sports include baseball, basketball, cross country, golf, soccer, swimming & diving, track (distance), water polo and wrestling; while women's sports include basketball, cross country, golf, soccer, softball, stunt, swimming & diving, track (distance), volleyball and water polo; and co-ed sports include cheerleading and dance. In 2017, Cal Baptitst announced that women's beach volleyball will be a varsity sport "in the near future", but no specific date for the addition of the sport has been given.

Championships 
The Lancers won the 2021 and 2022 Division I/II national championships in STUNT, a sport not currently recognized by the NCAA and governed by the College STUNT Association.

Team

References

External links